Daphne kosaninii is a shrub, of the family Thymelaeaceae. It is native to south-western Bulgaria in the Pirin and Slavyanka mountain ranges, and North Macedonia, specifically Suva Gora.

Description
The shrub is evergreen, and grows up to 0.2 meters tall. Its flowers are tinged pink and white, its fruits are orange, and its leaves are blue-green. It is often found on rocky slopes and in open forests at high altitudes.

References

kosaninii
Flora of Bulgaria